Symbolism or symbolist may refer to:

Arts
 Symbolism (arts), a 19th-century movement rejecting Realism
 Symbolist movement in Romania, symbolist literature and visual arts in Romania during the late 19th and early 20th centuries
 Russian symbolism, the Russian branch of the symbolist movement in European art
 Symbol, something that represents, stands for or suggests an idea, belief, action, or entity
 Color symbolism, the use of colors within various cultures to express a variety of symbolic meanings

Religion
 Religious symbol, an iconic representation of a religion or religious concept
 Buddhist symbolism, the use of Buddhist art to represent certain aspects of dharma
 Christian symbolism, the use of symbols, including archetypes, acts, artwork or events, by Christianity
 Symbols of Islam, the use of symbols in Islamic literature, art and architecture
 Jewish symbolism, a visible religious token of the relation between God and man

Science
 Symbolic anthropology, the study of cultural symbols and how those symbols can be interpreted to better understand a particular society
 Symbolic system, a system of interconnected symbolic meanings
 Solar symbol, a symbol which represents the Sun in psychoanalysis, symbolism, semiotics, or other fields

See also
 Symbolic representation (disambiguation)
 Symbolic (disambiguation)
 Symbology (disambiguation)
 Symbol (disambiguation)
 Realism (arts)
 Naturalism (arts)
 Representationalism